William A. Foster (September 18, 1937 – January 20, 1967) was a Canadian racecar driver.

Born in Victoria, British Columbia, Foster died in a crash during practice for a NASCAR Grand National stock car race at Riverside International Raceway in Riverside, California.

Foster won the 1963 CAMRA (Canadian American Modified Racing Association) in 1963 in the first year of the series. He also won the Utah Copper Cup race in 1963 and 1964.

Foster also drove in the USAC Championship Car series, racing in the 1964–1966 seasons, with 28 career starts, including the 1965 and 1966 Indianapolis 500 races. He finished in the top ten 10 times, with his best finish in 2nd position in 1966 at Atlanta.

He became best friends with Mario Andretti, who later claimed he would never again form a close friendship with a fellow racer because Foster's death so significantly affected him.

Foster ran a NASCAR Cup Series race at Riverside International Raceway in 1966 and finished 7th. He died in a practice for NASCAR race at Riverside in the following year. He also competed in 2 NASCAR West Series races in 1965.

Foster was a cousin of Canadian stock car driver Jim Steen and musician and producer David Foster.

He was inducted into the Canadian Motorsport Hall of Fame in 1993.

See also
List of Canadians in NASCAR
List of Canadians in Champ Car
Canadian Motorsport Hall of Fame

References

External links
 
 Victoria Auto Racing Hall of Fame entry
 Indianapolis 500 Career Stats
 Motor Sport Memorial entry
 Canadian Motor Sports Hall of Fame
 
 

1937 births
1967 deaths
Sportspeople from Victoria, British Columbia
Racing drivers from British Columbia
Indianapolis 500 drivers
NASCAR drivers
Racing drivers who died while racing
Sports deaths in California